Dongxing Securities Co., Ltd. is a Chinese investment bank and brokerage firm. The firm was a constituent of SSE 50 Index (since 28 November 2016) and CSI 100 Index.

In 2008 China Orient Asset Management spin-off part of their business to form Dongxing Securities. In 2015 Dongxing Securities became a public traded company in Shanghai Stock Exchange.

References

External links
 
 Official website of Dongxing Securities (Hong Kong)

China Orient Asset Management
Companies listed on the Shanghai Stock Exchange
Financial services companies of China
Investment banks in China
Investment management companies of China
Government-owned companies of China
Financial services companies established in 2008
Banks established in 2008
Chinese companies established in 2008
Companies based in Beijing
Companies in the CSI 100 Index